Unloved is a 2001 Japanese romance film.

Unloved or The Unloved may also refer to:

 The Unloved, a British television drama film
 The Unloved (TV series), a 1968 Australian courtroom drama TV series
 "Unloved" (Law & Order: UK), an episode of Unloved Law & Order
 Unloved (album), by Scottish mathcore band Frontierer
 "Unloved", a song by Jann Arden from her 1994 album Living Under June
 Unloved (band), an American alternative music group

See also
 La malquerida (telenovela), a Mexican telenova
 The Unloved Woman (disambiguation)